The Laurence Olivier Award for Best Director of a Play was an annual award presented by the Society of London Theatre in recognition of achievements in commercial London theatre. The awards were established as the Society of West End Theatre Awards in 1976, and renamed in 1984 in honour of English actor and director Laurence Olivier.

This award was introduced in 1991, along with Best Director of a Musical, when the original (and singular) Best Director award was divided. The new pair of awards were last presented in 1995, after which the original Best Director award returned to the roster of Olivier Awards.

Winners and nominees

1990s

See also
 Drama Desk Award for Outstanding Director of a Play
 Tony Award for Best Direction of a Play

References

External links
 

Director